Celestino Bruni, O.S.A. also Celestino Bruno (1585 – 31 May 1664) was a Roman Catholic prelate who served as Bishop of Boiano (1653–1664).

Biography
Celestino Bruni was born in Venice, Italy and ordained a priest in the Order of Saint Augustine. On 18 August 1653, he was appointed by Pope Innocent X as Bishop of Boiano. On 7 September 1653, he was consecrated bishop by Giovanni Battista Maria Pallotta, Cardinal-Priest of San Pietro in Vincoli, with Ranuccio Scotti Douglas, Bishop Emeritus of Borgo San Donnino, and Patrizio Donati, Bishop Emeritus of Minori as co-consecrators. He served as Bishop of Boiano until his death on 31 May 1664.

He was the author of "Parva Logica", and  Quodlibeticarum disputationum.

References

External links and additional sources
 (for Chronology of Bishops) 
 (for Chronology of Bishops) 

1585 births
1664 deaths
17th-century Italian Roman Catholic bishops
Bishops appointed by Pope Innocent X